Floriano is a Brazilian municipality in the state of Piauí.
It was founded by the Arabs and Syrians. It is situated in the physiographic zone of the Médio Parnaíba, on the right side of the Parnaíba River, in front of the city of Barão de Grajaú, in the Maranhão. It is also intersected by the rivers Gurguéia and Itaueira.

References

External links
 Atlas Digital do Piauí (PDF), detailed facts about the municipalities in Piauí.

Municipalities in Piauí
Populated places established in 1897